Angela Anna Margareta Kovács (born 23 May 1964 in Vaksala, Uppland) is a Swedish actress of Hungarian descent.  She studied at the Gothenburg Theatre Academy from 1987 until 1990.  She then began her career as a stage actress, working at the Gothenburg City Theatre, the Helsingborg City Theater, and the Royal Dramatic Theatre.  She began her film career in 2001 in Hans och hennes by Daniel Lind Lagerlöf.  From 2005 to 2007 she played Ann-Britt Höglund in the Wallander series of television films based on the eponymous novels.  More recently she has been seen as Irene Huss in a television series by that name based on the novels of Helene Tursten.

References

Swedish stage actresses
Swedish television actresses
Swedish people of Hungarian descent
People from Uppland
1964 births
Living people
20th-century Swedish actresses
21st-century Swedish actresses